Lawrence Kramer (born 1946) is an American musicologist and composer. His academic work is closely associated with the humanistic, culturally oriented New Musicology, now more often referred to as cultural or critical musicology. Writing in 2001, Alastair Williams described Kramer as a pioneering figure in the disciplinary change that brought musicology, formerly an outlier, into the broader fold of the humanities.

Biography
Kramer was born in Philadelphia and educated at the University of Pennsylvania and Yale. After several years on the English faculty at the University of Pennsylvania, he moved to Fordham University in New York where he has taught since 1978 and now holds the position of Distinguished Professor of English and Music. He is the author of fourteen books on music and over a hundred and fifty articles or chapters. Since 1993 he has been editor of the journal 19th-Century Music. He has held ten visiting professorships in North America, Europe, and China. His work has been translated into ten languages.

New musicology
New and/or Critical musicology rejected the idea of the autonomous musical artwork and sought to understand music in terms of its social and cultural relationships.   Controversial when introduced in the late 1980s, this position has since become foundational, while expanding further to include questions of affect, embodiment, and performance.  It has also expanded beyond Western classical music, the main focus of Kramer’s work, to include music in any genre.  Kramer’s Music as Cultural Practice (1990) set forth the principle that music takes on complex meanings as a result of its participation the circulation of valuations and practices that constitute culture.  The book introduced a number of terms, including its title phrase, which passed into common use, most prominently “hermeneutic windows” (pressure points in and around music from which multiple lines of cultural associations extend).  Between this book and The Thought of Music (2016; part of a trilogy also including Expression and Truth (2012) and Interpreting Music (2010), Kramer expanded his theoretical frame of reference to include performance, embodiment, voice,  music in media (especially film), and opera.  He has challenged the idea that musical meaning must be derived from musical form and has repeatedly rejected oppositions between  score and performance and performance and meaning.  He has drawn on speech act theory, deconstruction, Lacanian psychoanalysis, and philosophy, especially by Heidegger and Wittgenstein, to develop a pragmatic theory of interpretation, “descriptive realism,” which asserts that interpretation is a form of knowledge, not merely opinion, first as applied to music and then applied in general.  This in turn became the basis of a wider theory of humanistic knowledge that embraces uncertainty and creativity and takes musical experience as its paradigm. In The Hum of the World: A Philosophy of Listening (2019), Kramer extended this theory to the experience of sound and the relationship of listening to knowledge.

Hermeneutics
David Beard and Kenneth Gloag credit Kramer with bringing questions about hermeneutic models and processes—questions of meaning—to the forefront of musicology. In this respect they follow Grove Music Online, which credited Kramer with being the first English-language scholar to give musical hermeneutics a firm theoretical basis and a practical means of proceeding. This approach to musical meaning encompasses music with texts as well as instrumental music.  According to Steven Paul Scher, writing in 1999, Kramer's development of new critical languages was preeminent in advancing the study of text-music relations.  David Gramit similarly credited Kramer with remapping the intersection of literary theory and music and demystifying aesthetic experience while also upholding its value.

Compositions
Kramer's compositions, including eight string quartets, fifteen song cycles, and numerous standalone songs, have been widely performed in the United States and Europe in venues including New York, Santa Fe, Edinburgh, London, Vienna, Stockholm, Graz, Ghent, and Bern. In 2013, his string quartet movement "Clouds, Wind, Stars" won the Composers Concordance “Generations” award.
Kramer's compositions include:
"Colors of Memory" for piano.  
"Evocations" for piano and optional voice.
"Three Nocturnes" for viola and piano.  
"Questions of Travel" for cello and piano.  
"Cloud Shadows" for violin and piano.  
"A Short History" (of the Twentieth Century)" for voice and percussion.  
"The Wind Shifts" for voice and piano.  
"Pulsation" for piano quartet.
"Wingspan" for string sextet.
"The Hourglass" for cello and harp.
"Part Songs" for mixed chorus.

Books
The Hum of the World: A Philosophy of Listening (University of California Press, 2019)
The Thought of Music (University of California Press, 2016)
Expression and Truth: On the Music of Knowledge (University of California Press, 2012). 
Interpreting Music (University of California Press, 2010). 
Music as Cultural Practice: 1800-1900 (1990; University of California Press, 20th Anniversary Edition, 2010). 
Why Classical Music Still Matters (University of California Press, 2007). 
Porque É a Música Clássica ainda Importante? Trans. Fernanda Barão (Bizancio, 2010). 
Perchè la musica classica? Significati, valori, futuro. Trans. Davide Fassio (EDT, 2011). 
Critical Musicology and the Responsibility of Response: Selected Essays, Ashgate Contemporary Thinkers on Critical Musicology (Ashgate, 2006). 
Opera and Modern Culture: Wagner and Strauss (University of California Press, 2004). 
Musical Meaning: Toward a Critical History (University of California Press, 2001). 
Franz Schubert: Sexuality, Subjectivity, Song (Cambridge University Press, 1998). 
After the Lovedeath: Sexual Violence and the Making of Culture (University of California Press, 1997). 
Classical Music and Postmodern Knowledge (University of California Press, 1995). 
Music as Cultural Practice: 1800-1900 (University of California Press, 1990). 
Music and Poetry: The Nineteenth Century and After (University of California Press, 1984).

References

Further reading
Articles and chapters concerning Lawrence Kramer and New Musicology:
Joel Galand, "The Turn from the Aesthetic, " Current Musicology 58 (1995): 79-97. 
David Gramit, "The Roaring Lion: Critical Musicology, Aesthetic Experience, and the Music Department," Canadian University Music Review 19 (1998).  
Alastair Williams, Constructing Musicology (Ashgate, 2000). 
David Beard and Kenneth Gloag, Musicology: The Key Concepts (Routledge 2004). 
Patricia Debly, "The Myth of Musicology, Part 2", CAML Review 32 (2004)
Giles Hooper, The Discourse of Musicology (Ashgate 2006). 
David Clarke, “Between Hermeneutics and Formalism: the Lento from Tippett's Concerto for Orchestra (Or: Music Analysis after Lawrence Kramer),” Music Analysis 30 (2011): 309-59.  
Jonathan Goldman, "La New Musicology: Survol de la musicologie américaine des années 1990," Filigrane 11 (2010), 129-140.
Erik Wallrup, "Hermeneutics and Anti-hermeneutics of Music: The Question of Listening in Jean-Luc Nancy and Lawrence Kramer," Epekeina: International Journal of Ontology, 3 (2013), 307-320.
John Finney, Chris Philpott, and Gary Spruce, "Hermeneutics and the Making of (Critical) Meaning," in Creative and Critical Projects in Classroom Music: Fifty Years of Sound and Silence, (Taylor and Francis, 2020)
Nicholas Davey, "Displacing Hermeneutics with the Hermeneutical?" Duquesne Studies in Phenomenology 1 (2020).

1946 births
Living people
American musicologists
American male classical composers
American classical composers
20th-century classical composers
21st-century classical composers
Fordham University faculty
Yale University alumni
University of Pennsylvania alumni
21st-century American composers
20th-century American composers
20th-century American male musicians
21st-century American male musicians